Kelly Minter (born September 23, 1975) is a Christian worship leader, author, speaker, songwriter, and musician. The daughter of a pastor, Minter grew up in Northern Virginia and as a teenager was more interested in sports than music. When she was a senior in high school, Minter was offered and then lost a college basketball scholarship. To help her recover from that disappointment, Minter started playing the guitar.

In 1999 she headed to Nashville, Tennessee. Then in 2001 she started her career as a recording artist with her major-label debut, Good Day. Her next album, the 2003 Wrestling with Angels included the song “This Is My Offering,” which climbed to number one on the charts. After the 2003 album, Minter ended management and record ties and, eventually, began leading worship in churches, which she still does. Additionally, Minter leads worship and speaks at various events, including the Kingsway worship conference in England and the LifeWay Christian Resources After Eve event. She recently began teaching from the Christian Standard Bible.

Minter has toured with various Christian artists, including Sonicflood, Bebo Norman, and Watermark. She counts Margaret Becker her mentor in the music industry. Songs Minter has written have been recorded by Point of Grace, Joy Williams, Sonicflood, Sandi Patty, and Margaret Becker.

Minter is also a writer and author. She wrote a teen Bible study called Hannah’s One Wish and authors a Bible study series with LifeWay Christian Resources called "The Living Room Series," most recently "All Things New." No Other Gods, a Bible study and the first title in that series, was released in August 2007. She also wrote a longer book under the title No Other Gods title, released in 2008.

Works

Books

Discography 
Studio
 Wheels Of Change • Independent (1997)
 Good Day • Word (2001)
 Wrestling the Angels • Cross Driven Records (2003)
 Finer Day • Kingsway (2008)
 Loss, Love, and Legacy • Lifeway (2009)

Contributions to
 Love Divine • Kingsway (2007) - multi-artist CD
 Live at the Abbey • Kingsway (2007) - multi-artist CD & DVD

References

External links 
 

1975 births
Living people
American religious writers
Women religious writers
Christian music songwriters
Performers of contemporary Christian music
American performers of Christian music
People from Fairfax County, Virginia